Religious use of incense has its origins in antiquity. The burned incense may be intended as a symbolic or sacrificial offering to various deities or spirits, or to serve as an aid in prayer.

Buddhism, Taoism and Shinto in Asia

The first recorded use of incense was by the Egyptians during the Fifth Dynasty, 2345-2494 BC.

Incense use in religious ritual was either further or simultaneously developed in China, and eventually transmitted to Korea, Japan, Myanmar, Vietnam, Laos, Cambodia, Thailand, Indonesia, Malaysia, Singapore, and the Philippines. Incense holds an invaluable role in East Asian Buddhist ceremonies and rites as well as in those of Chinese Taoist and Japanese Shinto shrines for the deity Inari Okami, or the Seven Lucky Gods.  It is reputed to be a method of purifying the surroundings, bringing forth an assembly of buddhas, bodhisattvas, gods, demons, and the like.

In Chinese Taoist and Buddhist temples, the inner spaces are scented with thick coiled incense, which are either hung from the ceiling or on special stands.  Worshipers at the temples light and burn sticks of incense in small or large bundles, which they wave or raise above the head while bowing to the statues or plaques of a deity or an ancestor.  Individual sticks of incense are then vertically placed into individual censers located in front of the statues or plaques either singularly or in threes, depending on the status of the deity or the feelings of the individual. 

In Japanese Shinto shrines to Inari Okami or the Seven Lucky Gods and Buddhist temples, the sticks of incense are placed horizontally into censers on top of the ash since the sticks used normally lack a supporting core that does not burn.

The formula and scent of the incense sticks used in various temples throughout Asia vary widely.

Christianity 

Incense has been employed in worship by Christians since antiquity, particularly in the Roman Catholic Church/Eastern Catholic Church, Orthodox Christian churches, Lutheran Churches, Old Catholic/Liberal Catholic Churches and some Anglican Churches. Incense is being increasingly used among some other Christian groups as well; for example, the Book of Worship of The United Methodist Church calls for incense in the Evening Praise and Prayer service. The practice is rooted in the earlier traditions of Judaism in the time of the Second Jewish Temple. The smoke of burning incense is interpreted by both the Western Catholic and Eastern Christian churches as a symbol of the prayer of the faithful rising to heaven.  This symbolism is seen in Psalm 141 (140), verse 2: "Let my prayer be directed as incense in thy sight: the lifting up of my hands, as evening sacrifice." Incense is often used as part of a purification ritual.

In the Revelation of John, incense symbolises the prayers of the saints in heaven – the "golden bowl full of incense" are "the prayers of the saints" (cf. ) which infuse upwards towards the altar of God.

A thurible, a type of censer, is used to contain incense as it is burned. A server called a thurifer, sometimes assisted by a "boat bearer" who carries the receptacle for the incense, approaches the person conducting the service with the thurible charged with burning bricks of red-hot charcoal. Incense, in the form of pebbly grains or powder, is taken from what is called a "boat", and usually blessed with a prayer and spooned onto the coals. The thurible is then closed, and taken by the chain and swung by the priest, deacon or server or acolyte towards what or whom is being censed: the bread and wine offered for the Eucharist, the consecrated Eucharist itself, the Gospel during its proclamation (reading), the crucifix, the icons (in Eastern churches), the clergy, the congregation, the Paschal candle or the body of a deceased person during a funeral.

Incense may be used in Christian worship at the celebration of the Eucharist, at solemn celebrations of the Divine Office, in particular at Solemn Vespers, at Solemn Evensong, at funerals, benediction and exposition of the Eucharist, the consecration of a church or altar and at other services.  In the Eastern Orthodox Church, Anglo-Catholic, and Old Catholic/Liberal Catholic churches, incense is used at virtually every service.

Aside from being burnt, grains of blessed incense are placed in the Paschal candle, and were formerly placed in the sepulchre of consecrated altars, though this is no longer obligatory or even mentioned in the liturgical books.

Many formulations of incense are currently used, often with frankincense, benzoin, myrrh, styrax, copal or other aromatics.

Hinduism 

Incense in India has been used since 3,600 BC. The use of incense is a traditional and ubiquitous practice in almost all pujas, prayers, and other forms of worship.  As part of the daily ritual worship within the Hindu tradition, incense is offered to God (usually by rotating the sticks thrice in a clockwise direction) in His deity forms, such as Krishna and Rama.  This practice is still commonplace throughout modern-day India and Hindus all around the world.  It is said in the Bhagavad-Gita that, "Krishna accepts the offering made to Him with love", and it is on this principle that articles are offered each day by temple priests or by those with an altar in their homes and businesses.

Traditionally, the Benzoin resin and resin obtained from the Commiphora wightii tree were used as incense in ancient India. These resins would be spilled over embers which would give out perfumed smoke. However, the majority of the modern-day Incense of India is mostly of a chemical base rather than the natural ingredients.

Islam 

Incense is used in several events such as the Tahfidh graduation ceremony, and most notably the regular rite of purifying and cleansing the Ka'aba in Makkah. It is to perfume the air and uplift the souls of pilgrims. According to a hadith of the Prophet Muhammad, the angels love fragrant scents and hate foul smells.

The first group of people, who will enter Paradise, will be glittering like the full moon and those who will follow them, will glitter like the most brilliant star in the sky. They will not urinate, relieve nature, spit, or have any nasal secretions. Their combs will be of gold, and their sweat will smell like musk. The aloes-wood will be used in their censers. Their wives will be hûr al-ʿayn ("lovely-eyed"). All of them will look alike and will resemble their father Adam in being sixty cubits tall.

Olive tree leaves are also burnt as incense in some Muslim Mediterranean countries.

Judaism 

The 'ketoret' is the incense described in the Bible for use in the Temple.  Its composition and usage is described in greater detail in midrash, the Talmud and subsequent rabbinic literature.  Although it was not produced following the destruction of the Second Temple in 70 CE, some Jews study the composition of the ancient Temple incense for future use in a restored Temple as part of daily Jewish services.

Contemporary Judaism still uses aromatic spices in one ritual, the Havdalah ceremony ending the Sabbath. In addition, there is a blessing for pleasant smells.

Mandaeism 

In Mandaeism, incense (Mandaic: riha) is offered on stands called kinta by Mandaean priests to establish laufa (communion) between humans in Tibil (Earth) and uthras (celestial beings) in the World of Light during rituals such as the masbuta (baptism) and masiqta (death mass), as well as during priest initiation ceremonies. Various prayers in the Qolasta are recited when incense is offered. Incense must be offered during specific stages of the typically lengthy and complex rituals.

Contemporary Paganism 

Incense is also often used in Pagan rituals to represent the element of air, although more modern approaches to incense magic demonstrate that incense actually represents all of the elements. This is attributed to the fact that incense smoke wafts through the air, is created with fire, is produced with raw material grown from the earth, and combustible incense is formed using water. It is also believed to release natural energy. The use of "perfumed", "dipped", or synthetic incense is generally avoided, since artificial materials are believed to lack energies useful for magic.

Incenses of a wide range of fragrances are also used in spells and rituals for different purposes. Although many Pagan traditions associate specific botanical materials with certain magical attributes (see below), those definitions vary widely from one tradition to another. Generally speaking, Neopagans and Wiccans use incense for two basic purposes in modern rituals. First, incense is believed to create a magical atmosphere appropriate for the invocation (or inviting) of deities and spirits often present around the Pagan altar. Second, burning incense is believed to release the large amount of energy stored within natural incense so that it can be used for magical purposes.

The associations below do not hold true for all traditions, but provide a general look at the magical associations of incense.

Frankincense/Olibanum — purification, creating a devotional atmosphere, and spirituality. It is associated with the Sun, with frankincense in particular associated with masculine powers.
Myrrh — has similar properties to frankincense, though it is also used for healing and attraction. Was used for embalming in antiquity, and is associated with feminine powers.
Benzoin - purification
Sandalwood - devotion and purification
Copal — purification, spiritual cleansing, and cleansing physical items. Copal is a generic term for many different types of resins, with varieties including white, black, and golden.
Dragon's blood — burned for love, strength, and courage. Can be used to add potency to any spellwork.
Pine and Cedar — cleanse spaces of negative energies.

NOTE : "Paganism" is a broad term originating from the time of Rome, related to the term "Paganus" meaning a backwoods Villager. The information above is distinct and ONLY RELEVANT to new age "Paganism".  The Ancient Babylonians, Egyptians, Hellene (Greek & Roman) all burnt incense as offerings thousands of years ago. The burnings were ONLY utilized as offerings in order to appease the Gods, Spirits, or Ancestors. They were never used, at least by the unlearned, to garner "magic" or create a "mood". Distinct incenses both resin & floral were used and are mentioned in the Orphic Hymns, for instance, Frankincense being mentioned 22 times in the Orphic Hymns.

References

Incense in Christian worship 
 Holy Smoke: The Use of Incense in the Catholic Church.
 Incense (New Schaff-Herzog Encyclopedia of Religious Knowledge, Vol. V)
 Catholic Encyclopedia (1917) on Incense
 EWTN Catholic Questions: Why is incense used during Mass?
 General Instruction on the Roman Missal (GIRM) - incensation
 The Liturgical Customary of the Church of the Advent, Boston (Episcopalian) - Thurifer
 A Reason for Incense (Lutheran)
 The Archbishops on the Lawfulness of the Liturgical Use of Incense Anglican document from 1899.

Incense in Jewish tradition
 The Spiritual Significance of the Qetoret - Rabbi Avraham Sutton